Zyryanovo is a rural locality (a village) in Pelymskoye Rural Settlement, Kochyovsky District, Perm Krai, Russia. The population was 131 as of 2010. There are 4 streets.

Geography 
Zyryanovo is located 18 km northwest of Kochyovo (the district's administrative centre) by road. Proshino is the nearest rural locality.

References 

Rural localities in Kochyovsky District